Corycia is a synonym of several genera of Lepidoptera (butterflies and moths).

Corycia Hübner, 1825 is a synonym of Anaea Hübner, 1819 in the family Nymphalidae
Corycia Hübner, 1823 is a synonym of Eudocima Billberg, 1820 in the family Erebidae
Corycia Duponchel, 1829 is a synonym of Lomographa Hübner, [1825] in the family Geometridae
Corycia Hübner, [1825] is a synonym of Memphis Hübner, [1819] in the family Nymphalidae

References